Kulturværftet (The Culture Yard in English) is a cultural centre located in Helsingør, Denmark.

The center was established in 2010, in the buildings of the former Helsingør Værft or Elsinore Shipyard. Kulturværftet is part of Kulturhavn Kronborg, a project by the city of Helsingør to leave the industrial era behind and enter a new chapter for the town.

Kulturhavn Kronborg is a joint initiative between Kronborg Castle, the Danish Maritime Museum, Kulturværftet, and Helsingør harbour, and is designed to offer a variety of cultural experiences to residents and visitors.

Recent notable events include hosting the annual Clickfestival and hosting the INDEX: Award Ceremony

References

External links

 Official website 
 The Culture Yard 
 Kronborg Castle in Elsinore 
 Danish Maritime Museum 
 The port of Elsinore 
 Helsingør Tourist Bureau website 
 Port of Helsingør 
 Helsingør municipality's official website 

Helsingør
Ports and harbours of Denmark
Modernist architecture in Helsingør
2010 establishments in Denmark
Cultural centers in Denmark